Jianguomen Outer Street, also transliterated as Jianguomen Wai Avenue is a major street in urban Beijing. It forms part of the extended Chang'an Avenue.

It runs from Jianguomen Bridge in the west through to Guomao on the east.

It runs through some remarkably commercialised areas. The Beijing Friendship Store is on Jianguomen Outer Street, as is Guiyou Market.

The eastern stretches run directly through the centre of the Beijing CBD. The China World Trade Centre lies at the Guomao/Dabeiyao crossing.

Line 1 of the Beijing subway runs along the route.

See also
Jianguomen Inner Street

Streets in Beijing